Bruce Johnstone may refer to:

Bruce Johnstone (musician) (born 1943), American jazz saxophonist
Bruce Johnstone (racing driver) (born 1937), South African Formula One racing driver
D. Bruce Johnstone (born 1941), American educator, former chancellor of SUNY

See also
Bruce Johnston (disambiguation)
Bruce Johnson (disambiguation)